József Kasza (6 February 1945 – 3 February 2016) was a Serbian politician, economist, and banker. An ethnic Hungarian, he led the Alliance of Vojvodina Hungarians from 1995 to 2007.

He was the Deputy Prime Minister of Serbia in the Governments of Zoran Đinđić and Zoran Živković, and the chairman of the Alliance of Vojvodina Hungarians from 1995 to 2007. Kasza was then an honorary president of the party until the title was revoked because of various disagreements on internal issues.

Personal life
His parents were Sándor Kasza and Erzsébet Pásztás. He was married. His wife was Ildikó Árpási. They had three children - a daughter, Kinga and two sons, Csongor and Miksa.

References

1945 births
2016 deaths
Mayors of Subotica
Alliance of Vojvodina Hungarians politicians
Government ministers of Serbia
Serbian people of Hungarian descent